Lia Ryan McHugh (born November 2005) is an American actress. She has roles in Totem (2017), The Lodge, and Into the Dark (both 2019). She portrayed Sprite in the Marvel Cinematic Universe (MCU) film Eternals (2021).

Early life
McHugh was born in November 2005 in Pittsburgh, Pennsylvania, into an acting family. She has three older siblings—Flynn, Logan and Shea—and a younger sibling, Gavin, who has cerebral palsy. Gavin is also an actor and plays Christopher Diaz in the drama series 9-1-1.

Career
McHugh has spent the majority of her career appearing in horror projects; A Haunting, Totem, Along Came the Devil, The Lodge, Into the Dark, and A House on the Bayou. She portrayed Sprite in the Marvel Cinematic Universe film Eternals, which was released in November 2021.

Filmography

Film

Television

References

External links
 

Living people
2005 births
Actresses from Pittsburgh
21st-century American actresses
American child actresses
American film actresses
Date of birth missing (living people)
American television actresses